The Château de Dyo is a ruined castle in the commune of Dyo in the Saône-et-Loire département of France. The castle stands on a hill in the village.

Description 
Of the large enceinte that once surrounded the summit of the hill, only stretches of the southern wall now remain - perhaps the part of the original castle itself. The bases of three circular towers are visible. To the west stands a high gate tower of almost square plan, pierced with a few openings, which seems to have been built in the 13th century. Residential buildings and barns - some built on the bases of the curtain walls - and vegetable gardens occupy the enceinte.

The castle is private property and not open to the public.

History 

Occupation of the site seems to date back to the Carolingian era.
 End of 11th century: the fiefdom belonged to the Dyo (or Dio) family.
 1336: with the marriage of Guyot de Dyo and Alix Palatin, the Dyos added Palatin to their name.
 Middle of the 17th century: by marriage, Marie-Élisabeth Palatin de Dyo took the seigneurie to Louis-Antoine-Hérard (family of Damas d'Anlezy).
 1789: Marie-Angélique de Gassion, widow of Louis Damas d'Anlezy, was owner.
 18th century: the castle fell into ruins.
 Middle of the 20th century: renovations to the keep and part of the fortifications.

See also 
 List of castles in France

References

Bibliography 
 VIGNIER Françoise (sous la dir. de) : Le Guide des Châteaux de France, 71 Saône-et-Loire, Editions Hermé, Paris, 1985.

Ruined castles in Bourgogne-Franche-Comté
Saône-et-Loire
House of Damas